Charles Fambrough (August 25, 1950January 1, 2011) was an American jazz bassist, composer and record producer from Philadelphia.

Fambrough was a member of Art Blakey's Jazz Messengers during the early 1980s.

Suffering from kidney failure, congestive heart failure, and pulmonary hypertension, he died in 2011 at the age of 60.

Discography

As leader

As sideman
With Kei Akagi
 Mirror Puzzle (1994)
With Art Blakey
 Live at Montreux and Northsea (Timeless, 1980)
 Art Blakey in Sweden (Amigo, 1981)
 Album of the Year (Timeless, 1981)
 Straight Ahead (Concord Jazz, 1981)
 Killer Joe (Union Jazz, 1981) - with George Kawaguchi
 Keystone 3 (Concord Jazz, 1982)
 Oh-By the Way (Timeless, 1982)
With Craig Handy
 Introducing Three for All + One (Arabesque, 1993)
With Wynton Marsalis
 Fathers and Sons (1982)
 Wynton Marsalis (Columbia, 1982)
With Eric Mintel
 Impressions of Jazz (Jazz Lions, 1996)
With Pharoah Sanders
 Crescent with Love (Venus, 1992)
With McCoy Tyner
 Focal Point (1976)
 The Greeting (1978)
 Horizon (1979)
With Roland Kirk
 Boogie-Woogie String Along for Real (1977)

References

External links 
 Charles Fambrough Obituary, Last Moments
 Obituary at The Philadelphia Inquirer.
 Additional biographical material at The Philadelphia Inquirer.

1950 births
2011 deaths
American jazz double-bassists
Male double-bassists
Hard bop double-bassists
The Jazz Messengers members
Musicians from Philadelphia
Post-bop double-bassists
Jazz musicians from Pennsylvania
American male jazz musicians
CTI Records artists